Anthony James Fels (born 19 November 1964) is a former Australian member of parliament and perennial candidate for public office. He was a member of the Western Australian Legislative Council representing the Agricultural Region from 2005 to 2009, representing the Liberal Party (2005–2008) and later the Family First Party (2008–2009).

Early life
Fels was born on 19 November 1964 in Esperance, Western Australia. He is the son of Pauline and Francis Fels.

Fels grew up on the family farm in Esperance, attending Castletown Primary School and Esperance Senior High School. After leaving university he started a kebab shop in Cottesloe. He later worked for the Primary Industry Bank of Australia from 1989 to 1994 and was active in various business ventures including PKB Watering Supplies, Rowlands Stockfeeds and Liquid Engineering.

Parliamentary career
Fels joined the Liberal Party in the 1980s. He was an unsuccessful preselection candidate for the Roe prior to the 1989 Western Australian state election. He was the Liberal candidate in Roe at the 2001 election but was defeated by the incumbent National MP Ross Ainsworth.

At the 2005 state election, Fels was elected to the Legislative Council  representing the Agricultural Region for the Liberal Party. In 2007, he was found to be in contempt of Parliament by a select committee report for giving false answers to a parliamentary inquiry. Despite attempts from the Liberal Party to remove Fels, he resigned from the Liberal Party in August 2008, and attempted to form his own party called People Against Daylight Saving. He later joined Family First. He was leader of WA Family First before they merged with the Australian Conservatives.

Later candidacies
Fels was an independent candidate for the Senate at the 2010 federal election and for the state Legislative Council at the 2013 election, a Katter's Australian Party candidate for the Senate at the 2013 federal election, and a Mutual Party candidate at the 2014 special Senate election.

, Fels was a member of One Nation. At one stage it was reported that he had been preselected as a One Nation candidate at the 2017 state election, but the party later said that he had not yet been endorsed.

Fels was a nominated candidate representing the Non-Custodial Parents Party (Equal Parenting) in the 2017 Bennelong by-election. He came last of 12 candidates with a primary vote of less than 0.2 percent. He was a candidate for Clive Palmer's United Australia Party at the 2019 Australian federal election.

References

1964 births
Living people
Members of the Western Australian Legislative Council
Liberal Party of Australia members of the Parliament of Western Australia
Independent members of the Parliament of Western Australia
Family First Party politicians
Katter's Australian Party politicians
People from Esperance, Western Australia
21st-century Australian politicians